Cryptolechia furcellata is a moth in the family Depressariidae. It was described by Wang in 2004. It is found in China (Guizhou).

References

Moths described in 2004
Cryptolechia (moth)